Flaithbertaigh Ua Flaithbertaigh (died 1098) was King of Iar Connacht.

Biography

Flaithbertaigh was third or fourth chief of the Muintir Murchada before their expulsion from Uí Briúin Seóla by the Ua Conchobair kings of Connacht. The first to bear the surname was Murchadh an Chapail Ua Flaithbheartaigh, King of Uí Briúin Seóla (died 1036).

He was foster-father to the then King of Connacht, Ruaidrí na Saide Buide, who was in turn godfather to Flaithbertaigh's children. In 1092 he subdued Ruaidri in his own house and had him blinded, making himself king in Ruaidri's place. However, in 1098, possibly after being dethroned, he was killed by the family of Ruaidri.

See also

 Ó Flaithbertaigh

References

 West or H-Iar Connaught Ruaidhrí Ó Flaithbheartaigh, 1684 (published 1846, ed. James Hardiman).
 Origin of the Surname O'Flaherty, Anthony Matthews, Dublin, 1968, p. 40.
 Irish Kings and High-Kings, Francis John Byrne (2001), Dublin: Four Courts Press, 
 Annals of Ulster at CELT: Corpus of Electronic Texts at University College Cork
 Byrne, Francis John (2001), Irish Kings and High-Kings, Dublin: Four Courts Press, 
 Martyn, Adrian, The Tribes of Galway:1124–1642, Galway, 2016. 

People from County Galway
1098 deaths
Kings of Connacht
Flaithbertaigh
11th-century Irish monarchs
Year of birth unknown